Brigadier-General Andrews Windsor (1678–1765), of Southampton, was a British Army officer and politician.

He was born the fourth son of Thomas Hickman-Windsor, 1st Earl of Plymouth and was the child of his father's second marriage to Ursula Widdrington, daughter of Sir Thomas Widdrington, Lord Chief Baron of the Exchequer. He was styled "The Honourable". His younger brothers were Dixie Windsor, MP and Thomas Windsor, 1st Viscount Windsor. He joined the army as a Cornet in the Royal Horse Guards in 1698, and was promoted captain and then lieutenant-colonel in the 1st Foot Guards in 1703, as a brevet-colonel in 1706 and colonel in 1709–15 in the 28th Foot. He was finally made brigadier-general in 1711.

He was a Member (MP) of the Parliament of Great Britain for Bramber 1710 to 1715 and for Monmouth Boroughs 1720 to 1722. He inherited the Upper Avon Navigation from his father, who had acquired the rights to it from the future King James II of England.

He died unmarried in 1765.

References

1678 births
1765 deaths
Politicians from Southampton
British Army generals
Members of the Parliament of Great Britain for English constituencies
Members of the Parliament of Great Britain for Welsh constituencies
British MPs 1710–1713
British MPs 1713–1715
British MPs 1715–1722
28th Regiment of Foot officers
Grenadier Guards officers
Royal Horse Guards officers
Younger sons of earls
Military personnel from Southampton